The Hong Kong Mile is a Group 1 flat horse race in Hong Kong which is open to thoroughbreds aged three years or older. It is run over a distance of 1,600 metres (about 1 mile) at Sha Tin, and it is scheduled to take place each year in mid December.

The race was first run in 1991, and it was originally titled the Hong Kong International Bowl. Its distance was initially set at 1,400 metres. The event's present title and distance were both introduced in 1999, and the following year it was promoted to Group 1 status.

The Hong Kong Mile is one of the four Hong Kong International Races, and it presently offers a purse of HK$30,000,000 (approximately US$3.8 million).

Records
Speed record: (at present distance of 1,600 metres)
 1:32.71 – Good Ba Ba (2008)

Most wins:
 3 – Good Ba Ba (2007, 2008, 2009)

Most wins by a jockey:
 3 – Olivier Doleuze (2006, 2007, 2009)
 3 - Zac Purton (2012, 2016, 2018)

Most wins by a trainer:
 4 - John Moore (2011, 2014, 2017, 2018)

Most wins by an owner:
 3 – John Yuen Se Kit (2007, 2008, 2009)

Winners

 The "1992" race actually took place in April 1993 – it had been postponed in December due to an equine virus.

See also
 List of Hong Kong horse races

References
Racing Post:
 , 
 Racing Information of Cathay Pacific Hong Kong Mile (2011/12)
 Website of Cathay Pacific Hong Kong Mile (2011/12)
 The Hong Kong Jockey Club
 horseracingintfed.com – International Federation of Horseracing Authorities – Hong Kong Mile (2016).
 pedigreequery.com – Hong Kong Mile – Sha Tin.

Open mile category horse races
Horse races in Hong Kong
Recurring sporting events established in 1991
1991 establishments in Hong Kong